The 2009–10 RBS Pentangular One Day Cup was the second edition of the Pentangular One Day Cup, a List A (limited overs) cricket tournament held in Karachi, Pakistan. Five teams participated in the competition; four Pakistan provincial teams and one representing the capital.

Sindh Dolphins won the tournament by defeating Baluchistan Bears in the final.

Final

References

2010 in Pakistani cricket
Cricket in Karachi
2009-10
Domestic cricket competitions in 2009–10
April 2010 sports events in Asia